Catocala lara is a moth of the family Erebidae first described by Otto Vasilievich Bremer in 1861. It is found in Russia, Japan and Shanxi, China.

References

Moths described in 1861
lara
Moths of Asia